Chahar Bagh in Tehran Province may refer to:
 Chahar Bagh, Malard
 Chahar Bagh, Shemiranat